Britz is the surname of the following people
Bernhard Britz (1906–1935), Swedish cyclist
Boetie Britz (born 1987), South African rugby union player
Chuck Britz (1927–2000), American recording engineer
David Britz (born 1980), American scientist and engineer
Gerrie Britz (born 14 April 1978) is a South African former rugby union player.
Greg Britz (born 1961), American ice hockey player
Jerilyn Britz (born 1943), American professional golfer
Rudi Britz (born 1989), South African rugby union player
Tienie Britz (born 1945), South African golfer
Willie Britz (born 1988), South African rugby union player